Noémi Lefebvre (born 1964) is a French writer. She studied music and politics, eventually becoming a political scientist at the Instituts d'études politiques of Grenoble II. She has written several books, among them L’autoportrait bleu (2009), her debut novel which has been translated into English by Sophie Lewis; L'état des sentiments à l'âge adulte (2012); L’enfance politique (2015) and Poétique de l'emploi (2018).

She was born in Caen and lives in Lyon.

References

1964 births
Living people
21st-century French women writers
French political scientists
Women political scientists
Writers from Lyon
21st-century French novelists
French women novelists
Writers from Caen